Space Jazz: The soundtrack of the book Battlefield Earth is a music album and soundtrack companion to the novel Battlefield Earth by L. Ron Hubbard, released in 1982. Hubbard composed the music for the album.

History
The album was recorded in Los Angeles in 1982 and released by Applause Records. A 1983 press release put out by the Church of Spiritual Technology subsidiary company Author Services Inc. marketed the concept album as "the only original sound track ever produced for a book before it becomes a movie". The album includes performances by prominent musicians Chick Corea (keyboards), Stanley Clarke (bass), Nicky Hopkins (keyboards) and Gayle Moran (keyboards/vocals). Hopkins was known for his work in rock and roll, the others mainly as jazz musicians; all were, at the time, associated with Scientology. The album features extensive use of the Fairlight CMI synthesizer.  A demonstration of the "computer space jazz" soundtrack was one of the festival displays at the 1982 US Festival rock concert in California.

L. Ron Hubbard's son Ronald DeWolf filed a probate case in November 1982, after his father had not made any public appearances since 1980, requesting to be appointed trustee of Hubbard's estate on the grounds that his father was missing or dead. In 1983, attorneys representing Hubbard produced a letter in Hubbard's handwriting and with his fingerprints, in which he wrote that he had not had a leadership role in the Church of Scientology for "nearly 17 years", and mentioned his new novel Battlefield Earth, his recently released album Space Jazz, and 10-volume novel Mission Earth. "I am actively writing, having published Battlefield Earth, and my Space Jazz album; a projected ten-volume work, Mission Earth, is in the pre-publication stage at the moment", said Hubbard's statement. In conjunction with the release of Hubbard's letter, Church of Scientology President Heber Jentzsch told the press that Hubbard had produced Space Jazz around December 1982, and wrote the majority of songs and lyrics for the computer-based music on the album.

In 1984, the LP was retitled to Battlefield Earth. According to a 1987 statement from Norman F. Starkey, the executor of Hubbard's estate, the copyright to Hubbard's works passed to the Church of Scientology after his death. In addition to copyright of Space Jazz, other copyrighted music titles by Hubbard included "Tarzan", "The Black Cape" and "Snake Head".

Reception
A 1983 review of the work for Stereo Review commented that the wording used in the jacket copy of the album was "hyperbolic". In a 2003 review for Locus Online, Jeff Berkwits noted: "The eclectic 1982 album is reportedly the first soundtrack ever written for a book, and highlights performances from jazz greats Chick Corea and Stanley Clarke". A copy of Space Jazz was given out to the first prize recipient in the 2006 Worst Record competition by the New Jersey newspaper the Hunterdon Democrat. The Vinyl Factory Amar reviewer Ediriwira said, "if this isn't one of jazz's worst, it's certainly its craziest".

Track listing
Space Jazz

Personnel
Artists
L. Ron Hubbard
Chick Corea
Rick Cruzen
Nicky Hopkins
Stanley Clarke
Tamia Arbuckle
Fernando Gambos
Tomo Allison
Charlie Rush
Gayle Moran
Charlie George - Backing vocals on "Terl, The Security Director"

Production personnel
All arrangements and orchestrations by - Rick Cruzen and Tamia Arbuckle
Under the direction of - L. Ron Hubbard
Recorded and mixed at - Mad Hatter Recording Studios in Los Angeles
Produced by - Golden Era Musicians
Engineered by - Bernie Kirsk
Technician - Gary Lew
Assistant Engineer - Eric Westfall
Mixed by - Rick Cruzen

See also

Mission Earth
The Road to Freedom
To the Stars

References

External links

Battlefield Earth - The Music

Book soundtracks
L. Ron Hubbard albums
Chick Corea albums
1982 soundtrack albums
Music based on science fiction works
Jazz albums by American artists
Jazz soundtracks
Science fiction concept albums